Walter Ledermann FRSE (18 March 1911, Berlin, Germany – 22 May 2009, London, England) was a German and British mathematician who worked on matrix theory, group theory, homological algebra,  number theory, statistics, and stochastic processes. He was elected to the Royal Society of Edinburgh in 1944.

Education
Ledermann studied at the Köllnisches Gymnasium and Leibniz Gymnasium in Berlin, from which he graduated in 1928 at the age of 17. He went on to study at the University of Berlin, but due to the rise of Hitler and antisemitism, was forced to flee Germany shortly after he completed his undergraduate studies in 1934. Through the International Student Service in Geneva, he was able to obtain a scholarship to study at the University of St Andrews in Scotland. His doctoral work at St Andrews was supervised by Herbert Turnbull. He was awarded his PhD in 1936. Whilst working at the University of Edinburgh with Professor Sir Godfrey Thomson, Ledermann was granted a DSc in 1940 for his work with Thomson on intelligence testing.

Career
He taught at the universities of Dundee, St Andrews, Manchester, and finally Sussex. At Sussex, Ledermann was appointed professor in 1965, where he continued to teach until he was 89. He wrote various mathematics textbooks.

Publications
; 2nd edn. 1953; 3rd edn. 1957; 4th rev. edn. 1961

; also published 1966 (New York, Dover)
; 2nd edn. 1996 Addison-Wesley
; 2nd edn. 1987

; 10 editions from 1980 to 1991

References

Further reading

Interview with Walter Ledermann – Gap system.org

1911 births
2009 deaths
Scientists from Berlin
Jewish emigrants from Nazi Germany to the United Kingdom
Alumni of the University of St Andrews
20th-century German mathematicians
21st-century German mathematicians
20th-century British mathematicians
21st-century British mathematicians
Academics of the University of Edinburgh
Academics of the University of Dundee
Academics of the University of St Andrews
Academics of the University of Manchester
Academics of the University of Sussex
Fellows of the Royal Society of Edinburgh